List of works by Nicolas Minorsky.

Books

Papers

Conferences

Patents

References

Mathematics-related lists
Bibliographies by writer